Ficus faulkneriana is a species of strangler fig in the family Moraceae native to Africa.

Distribution
The tree is endemic to coastal Kenya and Tanzania, and in the Usambara Mountains of Tanzania, in tropical East Africa.  It is found in coastal woodland and wooded grassland habitats.

Description

It is an IUCN Red Listed Vulnerable species, threatened by habitat loss from land use conversion to agriculture.   It is protected within Shimba Hills National Reserve, Gongoni Forest Reserve, and Amani Nature Reserve.

See also

References

External links
 IUCN Red List of All Threatened Species

faulkneriana
Endemic flora of Kenya
Endemic flora of Tanzania
Trees of Africa
Plants described in 1988
Vulnerable flora of Africa
Taxonomy articles created by Polbot